Taqakenarsheh (also Romanized as Ţāqākenārsheh) is a village in Jastun Shah Rural District, Hati District, Lali County, Khuzestan Province, Iran. At the 2006 census, its population was 36, in 9 families.

References 

Populated places in Lali County